My Love Is Gone may refer to:

"My Love Is Gone", a 1958 song by Ladders
"My Love Is Gone", a 2012 song by Russian Red
"My Love Is Gone" (Safia song), a 2016 song